Lucía Hoyos (born 5 March 1975) is a Spanish actress, presenter, and model.

Biography 
She was born in Seville on 5 March 1975, and she began her career when she was chosen Miss of her hometown in 1994. From this moment on she began to be a face known in cinema and television.

In 1999 she began her career as an actress with the series Journalists, and appeared in diverse series like Petra Delicate, Paradise, Ana and the 7 or Policemen, In The Heart of the Street.

Lately she acted in diverse short films like You carry it (2004), #Cyclops (2009), and in films like The Syndrome of Svensson (2006) or 4000 euros (2008).

In the year 2008 she was a protagonist in two series of television issued by Channel South: Put me a cloud and Rocío, almost mother. A year later she was the protagonist of Are accomplices, a series issued by Antenna 3, however it was cancelled in the second season for the lack of an audience. There were an extra 80 episodes that were issued later by the channel Nova. In the year 2015 she participated in the series Down there, with interpretations by Eugenia Benjumea.

In television she has collaborated in The Program of Ana Rosa, What bet?, They do not Shoot to the Pianist, and has been invited to the Pasapalabra many times. In 2006 she was the presenter at Telecinco in The program of summer, and in 2001 she presented Never will be a literate program and in 2003 Summer 3 in Channel South.

On 7 January 2016 Lucía became a contestant in the Spanish version of Celebrity Big Brother.

Filmography

Films

Series

Programs of television

References

External links
 

1975 births
People from Seville
Living people
21st-century Spanish actresses
Spanish television actresses
Spanish film actresses